Ann Bishop may refer to:

 Ann Bishop (biologist) (1899–1990), protozoologist from Cambridge University and member of the Royal Society
 Ann Bishop (journalist) (1931–1997), US broadcast journalist

See also
Anna Bishop (1810–1884), English operatic soprano
Anne Bishop (born 1955), American fantasy writer
Anne Bishop (activist) (born 1950), Canadian adult education writer and social activist